Albiorix  is a prograde irregular satellite of Saturn. It was discovered by Holman and colleagues in 2000, and given the temporary designation S/2000 S 11.

Albiorix is the largest member of the Gallic group of irregular satellites.

Name
It was named in August 2003 for Albiorix, "a Gallic giant who was considered to be the king of the world." The name is known from an inscription found near the French town of Sablet which identifies him with the Roman god Mars (an interpretatio romana).

Orbit

Albiorix orbits Saturn at a distance of about 16 million kilometers. The rotation period was measured by the ISS camera of the Cassini spacecraft to 13 hours and 19 minutes. 

The diagram illustrates the Albiorigian orbit in relation to other prograde irregular satellites of Saturn. The eccentricity of the orbits is represented by the yellow segments extending from the pericentre to the apocentre. 

Given the similarity of the orbital elements and the homogeneity of the physical characteristics with other members of the Gallic group, it was suggested that these satellites could have a common origin in the break-up of a larger moon.

Physical characteristics
Albiorix is red in color, but some parts of its surface are less red than others. Varying colours suggest a possibility of a large crater, leading to an alternative hypothesis that Erriapus and Tarvos could be fragments of Albiorix following a near-break-up collision with another body.

References

Ephemeris from IAU-MPC NSES

External links 
 David Jewitt pages

Gallic group
Moons of Saturn
Irregular satellites
 
Astronomical objects discovered in 2000
Moons with a prograde orbit